Jack Steve Squirek (born February 16, 1959) is a former professional American football linebacker in who played in the National Football League (NFL) for the Los Angeles Raiders from 1982 to 1986 and for the Miami Dolphins in 1986.

NFL career
Squirek is known for his interception in Super Bowl XVIII against the Washington Redskins: before the end of the first half, a Raiders drive stalled when Jim Plunkett's third down pass was incomplete, but Ray Guy's 27-yard punt pinned Washington at their own 12-yard line with 12 seconds left in the half. On the next play, Squirek intercepted Joe Theismann's screen pass and returned it for a touchdown to give the Raiders a 21–3 halftime lead. The Raiders went on to win, 38–9.

Retirement
Squirek has been living in the Cleveland area since his playing days, with his wife, Penny, and their two children, Jacob and Cassandra.  Squirek runs a cleaning and janitorial service in that area.

References

External links
 

1959 births
Living people
American football linebackers
Illinois Fighting Illini football players
Los Angeles Raiders players
Miami Dolphins players
Players of American football from Cleveland